Ali Abdulla Ali Al Ansari (Arabic:علي عبد الله علي الأنصاري) (born 4 September 1998) is an Emirati footballer. He currently plays for Masfout as a right back.

Career

Al-Wasl
Ali Abdulla started his career at Al-Wasl and is a product of the Al-Wasl's youth system. On 17 March 2018, Ali Abdulla made his professional debut for Al-Wasl against Al Dhafra in the Pro League, replacing Salem Al-Azizi .

References

External links
 

1998 births
Living people
Emirati footballers
Al-Wasl F.C. players
Masfout Club players
UAE Pro League players
UAE First Division League players
Association football fullbacks
Place of birth missing (living people)